KLKL (95.7 FM, "The River 95.7") is a radio station airing a classic hits format, licensed to Minden, Louisiana.  The station serves the Shreveport – Bossier City metropolitan area and is owned by Alpha Media LLC, through licensee Alpha Media Licensee LLC.  Its studios are located just north of downtown Shreveport, and the transmitter is in Haughton, Louisiana.

References

External links
 KLKL's official website

Classic hits radio stations in the United States
Radio stations in Louisiana
Alpha Media radio stations